Murder Will Out is a 1939 British crime film directed by Roy William Neill, starring John Loder, Jane Baxter and Jack Hawkins, and released by Warner Brothers.

The film is classed as "missing, believed lost" and is included on the British Film Institute's "75 Most Wanted" list of missing British feature films.

Plot summary
A jade collector is given a piece by a friend, but it soon brings trouble on his shoulders.

Cast
 John Loder as Dr. Paul Raymond
 Jane Baxter as  Pamela Raymond
 Jack Hawkins as Stamp
 Hartley Power as Campbell
 Peter Croft as Nigel
 Frederick Burtwell as Morgan
 William Hartnell as Dick
 Ian McLean as Inspector

Critical reception
TV Guide wrote, "could have been a good film had more effort been placed in developing the plot; as it is, it's almost impossible to figure out what is going on."

References

External links
BFI 75 Most Wanted entry, with extensive notes

1939 crime drama films
1939 films
British crime drama films
British black-and-white films
Films directed by Roy William Neill
Lost British films
1939 lost films
Warner Bros. films
Films shot at Teddington Studios
1930s English-language films
1930s British films